Eosqualiolus is an extinct genus of sharks in the family Dalatiidae. It was described by Sylvain Adnet in 2006, and the type species is E. aturensis, which existed during the middle Eocene of what is now France. A new species, E. skrovinai, which existed in what is now Slovakia during the Miocene period, was described by Charlie J. Underwood and Jan Schlogl in 2012, and named in honour of Michal Škrovina. E. skrovinai was described from 14 fossil teeth found in the Laksarska Nova Ves Formation; 9 upper and 5 lower, some of which were partial and some were complete.

Species
 Eosqualiolus aturensis Adnet, 2006
 Eosqualiolus skrovinai Underwood & Schlogl, 2012

References

Dalatiidae
Prehistoric shark genera
Eocene sharks
Miocene sharks
Fossils of France
Fossils of Slovakia